Eilema caledonica is a moth of the subfamily Arctiinae first described by Jeremy Daniel Holloway in 1979. It is found in New Caledonia, east of Australia.

References

Moths described in 1979
caledonica